Roxborough may refer to:

Places
 Roxborough, Manchester, Jamaica
 Roxborough, Philadelphia, Pennsylvania, US, a neighborhood
 Roxborough, Trinidad and Tobago, Tobago Island, Republic of Trinidad and Tobago
 Roxborough Castle, Ireland
 Roxborough Park, Colorado, a census-designated place in Douglas County, Colorado, US
 Roxborough State Park, and National Natural Landmark, Colorado, US
 Roxborough Township, Ontario, Canada
 Roxborough Township, Pennsylvania, US

People with the surname
 Charles A. Roxborough (1888-1963), American politician
 Elsie Roxborough (died 1949), American socialite 
 John Roxborough (academic administrator) (died 1509), Master of University College, Oxford
 John Roxborough (boxing manager), American bookmaker, boxing manager and sports gambler
 Roxy Roxborough (born 1951), American author, teacher, lecturer

Other

See also 
 
 Roxboro (disambiguation)
 Roxburgh (disambiguation)
 Roxbury (disambiguation)